Curramore is a rural locality north of Jamberoo, New South Wales in the Municipality of Kiama.

References

Localities in New South Wales
Municipality of Kiama